The Three Musketeers is an American Saturday morning cartoon produced by Hanna-Barbera Productions for NBC. It premiered in 1968, running for 18 episodes as a segment on The Banana Splits Adventure Hour. The cartoon is based on the famous 1844 novel The Three Musketeers by Alexandre Dumas.

Premise
Athos (voiced by Jonathan Harris), Porthos (voiced by Barney Phillips), Aramis (voiced by Don Messick), and D'Artagnan (voiced by Bruce Watson) partake in new adventures fighting the enemies of the crowned heads of France King Louis XIV (voiced by Don Messick) and Queen Anne (voiced by Julie Bennett). They are sometimes assisted by a queen's handmaid named Lady Constance Bonacieux (voiced by Julie Bennett) and her young nephew Tooly (voiced by Teddy Eccles). A recurring theme has Tooly trying to prove himself worthy of becoming a Musketeer but the Musketeers won't allow him into their services because of his age.  Tooley, who has a white horse, named Lightning, does get a present from the Musketeers, a mule for his birthday. Several of the cartoons end with the famous "All for one, and one for all" slogan.

Episodes

See also
 The Three Musketeers (1973)
 List of works produced by Hanna-Barbera Productions
 List of Hanna-Barbera characters

References

External links
 
Episode guide at the Big Cartoon DataBase

The Banana Splits
1968 American television series debuts
1969 American television series endings
NBC original programming
1960s American animated television series
American children's animated adventure television series
American children's animated fantasy television series
Hanna-Barbera superheroes
Television series by Hanna-Barbera
Television shows set in France
Television series set in the 17th century
Television shows based on The Three Musketeers
Television series segments